Tablelands is a rural locality in the Gladstone Region, Queensland, Australia.

History 
Tableland Provisional School opened on 1905 and closed circa 1916.

References 

Gladstone Region
Localities in Queensland